German submarine U-74 was a Type VIIB U-boat of Nazi Germany's Kriegsmarine during World War II.

Her keel was laid down on 5 November 1939, by Bremer Vulkan of Bremen-Vegesack, Germany as yard number 2. She was launched on 31 August 1940 and commissioned on 31 October, with Kapitänleutnant (Kptlt.) Eitel-Friedrich Kentrat in command until 23 March 1942, when he was succeeded by Oberleutnant zur See (Oblt.z.S.) Karl Friederich, who remained in charge until the U-boat's loss.

Design
German Type VIIB submarines were preceded by the shorter Type VIIA submarines. U-74 had a displacement of  when at the surface and  while submerged. She had two shafts and two  propellers.

U-74 was fitted with five  torpedo tubes (four fitted at the bow and one at the stern), fourteen torpedoes, one  SK C/35 naval gun, 220 rounds, and one  anti-aircraft gun The boat had a complement of between forty-four and sixty.

Service history

U-74 conducted eight patrols, sinking four ships totalling 25,619 GRT and damaging two others, totalling 11,525 GRT. She was a member of three wolfpacks.

First patrol
Having first moved from Kiel to the German controlled island of Helgoland (sometimes called 'Heligoland') and Bergen in Norway, U-74 departed for her first patrol on 5 March 1941. Her route took her through the gap between Iceland and the Faroe Islands and into the Atlantic Ocean, although one source - Uboat.net - gives her position as off the Belgian coast on 21 March. She sank Leonidas Z. Canbamis on 3 April southwest of Iceland, followed by damage to the armed merchant cruiser  close by on the same day. The auxiliary warship was fortunate because Kentrat, in U-74, had run out of torpedoes.

U-74 docked in St. Nazaire in occupied France on 11 April.

Second patrol
The boat's second foray was in a northwesterly direction, toward Greenland.

On 13 May she was assigned to group West in the area SSE of Cape Farewell, Groenland. On 16 May she comes across a group of American warships with 2 battleships and 3 destroyers.

On 21/22 May she was trying to attack convoy HX-126 but was driven off and attacked by two British warships ; the vessels were the corvette  and the destroyer . A mix of gunfire and depth charges (about 125 of them), were used. The damage inflicted was such that U-74 was obliged to return to France, but to Lorient, on the 30th. On 29 May, just before reaching the harbour she is fired upon with 6 fan of torpedoes by a British submarine, but she can evade the torpedoes.

U-74s involvement with the Bismarck
On 24 May 1941, the German battleship  and the heavy cruiser  sank the British battlecruiser  and damaged the accompanying battleship , beginning a three-day hunt that would involve nearly a hundred ships.

That concentration of ships was a very attractive set of targets; Kentrat was ordered to attack the British forces in this area. In the evening U-74 dived in order to listen for contact and detected another U-boat. By dawn on May 27, she surfaced; a hundred meters away, another U-boat appeared – , commanded by Kapitänleutnant Wohlfarth.

Earlier, Flottenchef Admiral Lütjens requested that Befehlshaber der Unterseeboote (Commander-in-Chief for Submarines, Karl Dönitz) provide a U-boat to recover Bismarcks war diary. BdU had given the order to Wohlfarth, but U-556 was both out of torpedoes and very low on fuel. Using a megaphone, Wohlfarth now passed the order on to Kentrat. He accepted and proceeded toward Bismarcks last known position.

It was clear to her crew that she would not survive.

At 10:36 U-74 heard sinking sounds but Kentrat could not determine whether it was Bismarck or a British ship. He came to periscope depth and saw battleships and cruisers directly in front of him. He tried to maneuver into an attack position, but the weather was too bad and the seas too high to remain at periscope depth or to fire a torpedo. Wreckage and yellow life-jackets were visible.

After the British ships left, Kentrat surfaced amid debris and dead bodies. The sounds they had heard that morning was Bismarcks destruction. They searched but they could find no one alive until that evening when they came across a raft carrying three sailors, Georg Herzog, Otto Höntzsch, and Herbert Manthey. U-74 searched for another day but found no one else alive and was ordered to return to Lorient. On the return trip, the three survivors recovered from their shock and gave the first statements of Bismarcks loss.

Third patrol
For her third sortie, U-74 sank Kumasian on 5 August 1941 west of Ireland. She returned to St. Nazaire on the 12th.

Fourth patrol
This success was followed the next day when she sank the Catapult Armed Merchantman .

Fifth patrol
This ship was on her maiden voyage, which was from Glasgow to New York. There were no survivors. The U-boat returned to St. Nazaire for the last time on 12 November 1941.

Sixth patrol
U-74s next patrol was into the Mediterranean. Leaving St. Nazaire on 9 December 1941, she had slipped past the heavily defended Straits of Gibraltar by the 16th. She entered La Spezia in Italy on 24 December.

Seventh patrol
The German submarine's first patrol in new surroundings was between Sicily and the Italian mainland and toward the British controlled port of Alexandria, which was reached on 3 January 1942. She returned to La Spezia on the eighth.

Eighth patrol and loss
Both attacks were unsuccessful.

47 men died; there were no survivors.

Wolfpacks
U-74 took part in three wolfpacks, namely:
 West (13 – 22 May 1941) 
 Brandenburg (15 – 20 September 1941) 
 Raubritter (1 – 6 November 1941)

Previously recorded fate
U-74 was sunk by the British destroyers HMS Wishart and HMS Wrestler and a PBY Catalina of 202 Squadron east southeast of Cartagena in Spain on 2 May 1942.

Summary of raiding history

See also
 Convoy SC 26
 Mediterranean U-boat Campaign (World War II)

References

Notes

Citations

Bibliography

External links

1940 ships
German Type VIIB submarines
Ships built in Bremen (state)
Ships lost with all hands
U-boats commissioned in 1940
U-boats sunk by depth charges
U-boats sunk by British warships
U-boats sunk in 1942
World War II shipwrecks in the Mediterranean Sea
World War II submarines of Germany
Maritime incidents in May 1942